The 1990 World Cup was the 14th edition of the FIFA international association football tournament.

1990 World Cup may also refer to:

1990 Men's Hockey World Cup
1990 Women's Hockey World Cup
1990 Alpine Skiing World Cup
1990 World Cup (snooker)